Philippe Cuper is a French clarinetist, born in Lille on 25 April, 1957.

He is considered to be one of the best representatives of the current French clarinet school.

Biography

Studies 
Cuper received his early training in Marcq en Baroeul (near Lille) from Gilbert Voisin (who in turn was a disciple of Louis Cahuzac). Cuper also attended various summer schools taught by Jacques Lancelot.

At the age of 20, he was principal clarinet in Paris Concerts Lamoureux Orchestra. He continued studying the clarinet under Guy Dangain as well as studying musicology at the Sorbonne Paris University.

In 1980, Cuper graduated "summa con maxima lauda" from the clarinet class of Guy Deplus at the Paris Conservatoire, he was awarded a "Premier Prix", first named with unanimous vote of the jury for clarinet and also for chamber music in 1981.

He then joined in 1980 the Orchestre de la Garde Republicaine as well as the World Youth Orchestra. All the while he continued to study the clarinet with Henri Druart and consulted with André Boutard and Stanley Drucker.

Philippe Cuper was a winner in many international competitions: 1982 Munich (ARD),1986 Prague, 1979 Viotti, Italy (Vercelli) and won a medal in Geneva (1979), Orvieto, Mravinsky medal in St Petersburg. He has been in the jury of many competitions: Munich, Prague, Beijing (2010),USA Young Artist, Romania (Cluj in 2011).

He organised the first "Louis Cahuzac international competition" in Versailles (2002).

The Soloist 

From 1984 he became Principal Clarinet ("Supersoliste") with the Opera national de Paris Orchestra (where he still plays today in 2011).

He played many times as guest principal clarinet with the Berlin Philharmonic Orchestra (Tour in South America and concerts in Berlin, on the internet in  October 2009), la Scala de Milan orchestra (2006), Sinfonia Varsovia, the Bavarian Radio Symphonic Orchestra, Orchestre de Paris, French Radio (National and Philharmonic orchestras) and all the contemporary music ensembles in Paris (Ars Nova, Musique Vivante, 2E2M)...
He played with all the best conductors: Ozawa, Sawallisch, Abbado, Maazel, Mehta, Boulez, Prêtre, Daniel Barenboim, Christoph von Dohnányi, Valery Gergiev, Esa-Pekka Salonen, Harding, Jurowski, Inbal, Jarvi, Oren, James Conlon, Chung Myung-whun, Armin Jordan, Philippe Jordan...

And as soloist with about 60 orchestras: Czech philharmonic, Bavarian Radio symphonic orchestra, Moscow symphonic, Kiev, Kharkow, Tokyo, Mexico, Guanajuato, Brisbane, Québec, Stavanger(Françaix concerto "live" for the Norvegian Radio), Brussels, Brugge, Namur (Schindelmeisser concerto for 4 clarinets with Boeykens, Vanspaendonck, Votano), Manchester, Asturias, Austin and Lubbock (Texas), Richmond Virginia, Lille, Toulouse, Picardie (Spohr second concerto "live" for Radio France), Cannes, Mulhouse, Caen (Nielsen concerto), Bretagne (concertos by Weber, Copland, Nielsen, Françaix and French Premiere of the C. V. Stanford concerto)...
He was invited in many ClarinetFests (Annual Congress of the International Clarinet Association. 2011: he will play the Francaix concerto).

The Repertory 

He worked with a lot of famous composers like Messiaen (Quartett), Francaix (Concerto, CD conducted by the composer), Sauguet (Sonatine), Rosenthal (Premiere of the sextet"Juventus"), Mihalovici, Max Deutsch (student of Schoenberg), Boulez, Dutilleux, Berio, Adams, Denisov, Knussen, Boutry, Palenicek, Camillieri (premiere of the trio with viola and piano), Holstein, Constant, Mefano, Aubain, Fénelon, Hersant, Komives (premiere of duet with viola in Tokyo), Bacri (concerto on CD), Zygel, Connesson, Escaich, Girard, Zavaro, Stankovitch (premiere of the concerto in Kiev)...
He played the premiere of Paquito d'Rivera pieces for 5 clarinets in Boston and the Gronych Concerto for 3 clarinets and orchestra. with the jazzman Eddie Daniels and the Klezmer Giora Feidman at the Tel Aviv Opera.
He played also music from others composers like Weinberg, Perkowski, Donatoni, Olah, Lehmann, Dallapiccola, Marquez, Maratka, Parra, Michael Daugherty Concerto (European Premiere in Brussels with the " Musique Royale des Guides" Concert Band)...

The Chamber Musician 

As chamber musician he played with:
- pianists: Badura-Skoda (Mozart and Beethoven Quintet),Pierre-Laurent Aimard (Bartok "Contrasts" and Schumann for Radio France), Planès, Chung (Messiaen Quartet), Rigutto, Dalberto, Luisada, Cassard, Desert, Cabasso, Chaplin, Hugonnard-Roche, Koerner, Paraskivesco, Ciocarlie...
- String players: Ruggiero Ricci, Jarry, Brussilowski, Korcia, Charlier, Wallez, Pasquier, Caussé, Henkel, Chiffoleau, Meunier, Strauss, Demarquette, Wieder-Atherton, Gaillard...
- Woodwind players: Schellenberger, Leleux, Audin, Gallois, Bernold... Paris Wind Octet...
- String quartets: Takacs, Talich, Kocian, Kapralowa, Venus, Vilanow, Alcan, Diabelli, Bernède, Parisi, Rosamonde, Arpeggione, Manfred, Debussy, Lalo, Benaim...

He played sometimes old original clarinets ("period clarinets")like for example Haendel trio for 2 clarinets with 3 keys and horn (Radio France).

Philippe Cuper is also a conductor: Martinu chamber orchestra in Cesky Krumlov festival, Les Virtuoses de l'Opera in Paris, Wind ensembles for Mozart,Dvorak,Holst,Strauss...

The Teacher 

Philippe Cuper received his teaching degree in 1982 (he is always professor at the National Conservatory of Versailles where the famous Hyacinthe Klosé was teacher in 1832) and became principal clarinet at the Paris Opera in 1984, which was the position of Cyrille Rose (19th century) and Xavier Lefèvre (18th century).

Philippe Cuper was a clarinet professor in "Conservatorio Superior d'Aragon" in Zaragossa (Spain)from 2006 to 2008.

He gives many masterclasses all over the world; Canada (Domaine Forget, London (Guildhall), Benidorm (Spain, Summer academy), Jerusalem (Rubin Academy,) Tokyo (Kunitachi University), Hong Kong, Taiwan, Seoul (University and Asian Youth Orchestra), Canberra, Brisbane, Prague (Academy), Moscow (Tchaikovsky conservatory), Saint Petersburg, Kiev, Cracow, Mexico, Guanajuato, Caracas (for the clarinettists of the Simon Bolivar Youth Orchestra), Rio de Janeiro, Buenos Aires, Cleveland (Music Institut), Boston (New England Conservatory), Atlanta, Austin and Lubbock in Texas), Richmond-Virginia, Chicago De Paul University and Northwestern University in 2008 (Live on internet).

Many of his students are now famous teachers in New York, Tokyo, Osaka University, Brussels Royal Conservatory, IMEP de Namur,Prag Conservatory, Switzerland, Bayonne Conservatory... and soloists in orchestras (Seoul Philharmonic, Mexico UNAM, Acapulco, Toluca, Santiago (Chile), New Zealand, Alicante (Spain), Winterthur (Switzerland), Liege Philharmonic (Belgium), Ensemble Orchestral de Paris, Orchestras from Lyon, Nice, Mulhouse, Bretagne, Nantes, Orchestre Français des Jeunes.

Discography 

He recorded more than 40 CDs as a soloist or chamber musician: Concertos by Stamitz,Pokorny ("The clarinet in Bohemia", Clarinet Classics label), Bréval, Mozart, Weber (the only one integrale by a French clarinetist), Ponchielli, Copland, Nielsen, Françaix (conducted by the composer,C D ADDA-Universal), Bacri (composed for him), Brahms and Mozart Quintets with the famous Talich Quartet from Prag (winner of the French Grammy Award: "Choc" of Le Monde de la musique magazine), Chamber pieces by Nielsen (Gallo label), Stamitz, Beethoven, Mahler, Dohnanyi, Glazunov (first recording of "Rêverie orientale"), Prokofiev, Shostakovich, Stravinsky, Khatchaturian, Schubert "Der Hirt auf dem Felsen", "Tim et Tom"(CD-book Gallimard, for children; "The Paris Connection (premiere of Bacri, Girard, Connesson, Clarinet Classics label), Louis Cahuzac Complete Music (first recording in 2002 from the manuscripts, Clarinet Classics to be published in 2011), "Kol Nidré"(2010), Milhaud's first recording of "Scaramouche"), Koechlin (first complete recording of "Les confidences d'un joueur de clarinette", Gallo label), Debussy Rhapsodie with the Moscow Symphonic, Ravel (Introduction et Allegro), Poulenc Sonatas ("new" original versions)...

DVD as principal clarinet at the Paris Opera (among many others including also Ballet Music): "La Clemenza de Tito" by Mozart with Susan Graham/Paris Opera, "Felicity Lott in recital", "La fille du regiment"by Donizetti with Alfredo Krauss, "L'Italienne à Alger"by Rossini ,"Manon" by Offenbach with Renée Fleming, "Rossignol" by Stravinsky with Nathalie Dessay...

CD of symphonic music as principal clarinet at the Paris Opera: Alpen Symphony by Strauss / cond. by Jordan (Naive label), Stravinsky / cond. by Conlon (EMI), Messiaen/ cond. by Chung (Deutsche Grammophone, Debussy(RCA)conducted by M. Frank with Radio France Philharmonic, "Der Wanderer" by Hersant with the Orchestre National de France...and also much Movies Music in Paris.

The editor of Music scores 

He is "directeur de collection" with the French music publishers Robert Martin and International Music Diffusion (Arpèges) in Paris.

Book references 

Gilbert, Richard - "Book The Clarinetists' Discography, Grenadillamusic.com

Lawson,Colin - The Cambridge companion to the Clarinet, Cambridge University Press.

Weston, Pamela  - Book Clarinet Virtuosi of Today, pp.72-76, Egon Publishers, 1989

In French:

Pâris, Alain -  Dictionnaire des interprètes, Editions Robert Laffont,Paris.

Articles 
1) On Philippe Cuper :

Chantaraud, Alain - Philippe Cuper : l'école française de clarinette sous influence ? - Harmoniques, ?°7, octobre 1999, pp6-7

Paul, Jean-Marie - Philippe Cuper : interview (in French) - Clarinette magazine, N°8, 1er trimestre 1986, pp4-7

Paul, Jean-Marie - Philippe Cuper : interview (in English, different from above) - Vandoren Magazine,#3, 2003, pp6-7 p4-7 Interview

(Cover and Interview in Japanese) - Band Journal, December 1993, #12 Publisher : Onga-Ku 

2) Made by Philippe Cuper :

N.B. For The Clarinet magazine, a list of papers can be found in http://www.clarinet.org/masterIndexAuthor.asp.

Clarinette magazine and Harmoniques are out of print magazines.

Cuper, Philippe; Paul, Jean-Marie - Paris Conservatoire Supérieur: "Solos de Concours" and Prize Winners - The Clarinet, vol.15 #3, pp40–48. Original paper : Les Concours du Conservatoire de Paris, 1795-1986 -  magazine, N°12, 1er trimestre 1987, pp4-11  

Cuper, Philippe - Checking points in the Jean Françaix Clarinet Concerto - Clarinet & Saxophone (CASS), Spring 1998, vol.23/1 (also out of print) http://www.cassgb.org/magazine-back-issue.php?id=46,
Printed also in Australian Clarinet and Saxophone, vol.1,1, March 1998, pp 17–19 “Jean Francaix Clarinet Concerto”; and in Spain: translated by Justo Sanz for the Spanish clarinet magazine,
- Originally in : Le concerto pour  de Jean Francaix - Clarinette magazine, N°28, décembre 1998, pp12–13,

Cuper, Philippe - Louis Cahuzac: The 20th-Century French Clarinetist - The Clarinet, vol.28 #1, pp48–57

Cuper, Philippe - In Memoriam - Henri Dionet (1911–2006) - The Clarinet, vol.34 #3, pp26–27

Cuper, Philippe - Hommage au clarinettiste André Boutard, 1924-1998 (in French) - Clarinette magazine, N°28, 1997, 9.49 - reproduced in Harmoniques, N°4, janvier 1999, p. 30

External links 
Biography (in French) and Discography from Vandoren website
Biography at Buffet Crampon's website

References 

French classical clarinetists
1957 births
Musicians from Lille
Conservatoire de Paris alumni
Living people
21st-century clarinetists